Ammoides pusilla, the small bullwort, is a plant in the family Apiaceae.

Sources

References 

Apioideae
Flora of Malta